Theodore Ginn Sr. (born November 10, 1955) is the coach of the Glenville High School Tarblooders football and track teams in Cleveland, Ohio. In 2001, Ginn, who started out working in the Cleveland Public School District as security guard at Glenville High, coached the U.S. Army All-American Bowl and in 2006 when he was the head coach. He also started the Ted Ginn Sr. Foundation Annual Combat Bus Tour, where he takes inner city high school football players around the country to all major college combines. In 2007, he helped establish Ginn Academy, an all-boys high school for at-risk Cleveland students.

As track and field coach, Ginn has led Glenville to six state championships, and in November 2006, a portion of Gray Avenue on the east side of Cleveland was renamed "Ted Ginn Sr. Avenue" in Ginn's honor.

In 2022 Ginn led Glenville to the OHSAA Division IV State Football Championship, marking not only Glenville's first football title, but also the first for a school from the Cleveland Metropolitan School District.

Awards and honors
Seven-time OHSAA champion 
Six as boys' track and field coach – 2003–2007, 2014)
One as head football coach (2022)
Gray Avenue in Cleveland renamed "Ted Ginn Sr. Avenue"
2023 Lifetime Achievement Award - Greater Cleveland Sports Awards

References

External links
Interview with Ted Ginn, Sr., conducted by Dan Coughlin at Cleveland Public Library's Sports Research Center in 2013.

1955 births
Living people
High school football coaches in Ohio
Sportspeople from Cleveland
School administrators